Matthew Bell (8 July 1897 – 1962) was an English footballer who played in the Football League for Hull City and Nottingham Forest.

References

1897 births
1962 deaths
English footballers
Association football defenders
English Football League players
West Hartlepool F.C. players
Hull City A.F.C. players
Nottingham Forest F.C. players